The 2014–15 Holy Cross Crusaders men's basketball team represented the College of the Holy Cross during the 2014–15 NCAA Division I men's basketball season. The Crusaders, led by fifth year head coach Milan Brown, played their home games at the Hart Center and were members of the Patriot League. They finished the season 14–16, 8–10 in Patriot League play to finish in a three way tie for sixth place. They advanced to the quarterfinals of the Patriot League tournament where they lost to Bucknell.

Roster

Schedule

|-
!colspan=9 style="background:#660066; color:#FFFFFF;"|  Exhibition

|-
!colspan=9 style="background:#660066; color:#FFFFFF;"|  Non-conference regular season

|-
!colspan=9 style="background:#660066; color:#FFFFFF;"| Conference regular season

|-
!colspan=9 style="background:#660066; color:#FFFFFF;"| Patriot League tournament

References

Holy Cross Crusaders men's basketball seasons
Holy Cross
Holy Cross Crusaders men's basketball
Holy Cross Crusaders men's basketball